Muyil (also known as Chunyaxché) was one of the earliest and longest inhabited ancient Maya sites on the eastern coast of the Yucatan Peninsula. Artifacts found here date back from as early as 350 BC. to as late as 1200-1500 AD. The ruins of Muyil are an example of Peten architecture, like those found in southern Mayan sites with their steep walled pyramids such as Tikal in Guatemala. It is situated on the Sian Ka'an lagoon, a name meaning "Where the Sky is Born". Muyil was located along a trade route on the Caribbean once accessible via a series of canals. Among the most commonly traded goods were Jade, obsidian, chocolate, honey, feathers, chewing gum, and salt. It is believed that throughout much of its history, Muyil had strong ties to the center of Coba located some  the north / northwest. The 2010 federal census reported a population of 191 inhabitants in the locality.

See also

References

External links
Muyil Archaeological Information. by Walter R. T. Witschey.

Maya sites in Quintana Roo
Former populated places in Mexico
Tourist attractions in Quintana Roo
Maya sites that survived the end of the Classic Period